Thomas Bruce Borland (February 14, 1933 – March 2, 2013), nicknamed "Spike", was an American relief pitcher in Major League Baseball who played portions of the 1960 and 1961 seasons for the Boston Red Sox.

Born in Kansas, Borland graduated from high school in McAlester, Oklahoma, and attended what is now Oklahoma State University, where he was named Most Outstanding Player of the 1955 College World Series. His minor league career began in 1955 with the Oakland Oaks of the Pacific Coast League, but he was declared a free agent by Commissioner of Baseball Ford Frick when it was discovered that the Baltimore Orioles had violated the bonus rule of the day by signing Borland, then loaning him to the Oaks. Signed then by the Red Sox, Borland missed two full years (1956–57) while serving in the United States Army. In 1959, he won 14 games, losing eight, and posted a strong 2.73 earned run average for American Association champion Minneapolis, and was promoted to the Red Sox in mid-May 1960.

In 27 MLB appearances (26 in 1960 and only one in 1961), including four games started, Borland posted an 0–4 record with a poor 6.75 ERA in 52 innings pitched, allowing 70 hits and 23 bases on balls. He struck out 32 and was credited with three saves as a relief pitcher.

As a minor leaguer he had a 48–39 record and a 3.42 ERA between 1955 and 1963. He was traded to the expansion Houston Colt .45s in March 1962 in exchange for Dave Philley, but never appeared in a Major League game for them. Instead, he spent two years in his home state for Houston's Triple-A affiliate, the Oklahoma City 89ers, before leaving baseball.

References

External links

Tom Borland at Baseball Library

1933 births
2013 deaths
All-American college baseball players
Baseball players from Kansas
Boston Red Sox players
College World Series Most Outstanding Player Award winners
Major League Baseball pitchers
Minneapolis Millers (baseball) players
Oakland Oaks (baseball) players
Oklahoma City 89ers players
Oklahoma State Cowboys baseball players
People from El Dorado, Kansas
People from McAlester, Oklahoma
Rapiños de Occidente players
Seattle Rainiers players
National College Baseball Hall of Fame inductees